was a Japanese ukiyo-e artist.  He is the only known student of Okumura Masanobu; many of his works nonetheless appeared from publishers other than Masanobu.

The majority of Toshinobu's works come from the Genbun era (1716–1741), and are mostly prints in the beni-e ("red picture[s]") and urushi-e ("lacquer picture[s]") styles.  Many of his works depict people selling things.  Toshinobu also made yakusha-e portraits of kabuki actors; in contrast to the Torii school, rather than heroics, Toshionobu tended to depict scenes of romance.

See also

References

External links

Works cited

 

17th-century Japanese artists
Ukiyo-e artists